Ancestim is a recombinant methionyl human stem cell factor, branded by Amgen as StemGen.  It was developed by Amgen and sold to Biovitrium, now Swedish Orphan Biovitrum, in December, 2008.

It is a 166 amino acid protein produced by E. coli bacteria into which a gene has been inserted for soluble human stem cell factor. It has a monomeric molecular weight of approximately 18,500 daltons and normally exists as a noncovalently associated dimer. The protein has an amino acid sequence that is identical to the natural sequence predicted from human DNA sequence analysis, except for the addition of an N-terminal methionine retained after expression in E. coli. Because Ancestim is produced in E. coli, it is nonglycosylated. Ancestim is supplied as a sterile, white, preservative-free, lyophilised powder for reconstitution and administration as a subcutaneous (SC) injection and is indicated for use in combination with filgrastim for mobilizing peripheral hematopoietic stem cells for later transplantation in certain cancer patients.

References

Recombinant proteins